Miguel Angel Pichardo Sosa (born February 8, 1980 in Santiago, Dominican Republic) is a professional basketball player. He is 6 ft 9 (2.06 m) and plays center. Pichardo is member of the Dominican Republic national basketball team.

References

 EuroBasket profile

1980 births
Living people
Basketball players at the 2003 Pan American Games
Centers (basketball)
Dominican Republic expatriate basketball people in Spain
Dominican Republic men's basketball players
Naturalised citizens of Spain
Pan American Games silver medalists for the Dominican Republic
Pan American Games medalists in basketball
Medalists at the 2003 Pan American Games